KFFA-FM (103.1 FM) is a radio station broadcasting an adult contemporary music format. Licensed to Helena, Arkansas, United States, the station is currently owned by Monte Spearman and Gentry Todd Spearman, through licensee Spearman Land and Development.

See also
 KFFA (AM)

References

External links

FFA-FM